Leopoldschlag is a municipality in the district of Freistadt in the Austrian state of Upper Austria. It is located on the European continental divide between the watershed of the Elbe and the Danube, on the border with the Czech Republic.

Population

References

Cities and towns in Freistadt District